Vittorio Umberto Antonio Maria Sgarbi (born 8 May 1952 in Ferrara) is an Italian art critic, art historian,  writer, politician, cultural commentator and television personality. He is President of the Museum of Modern and Contemporary Art of Trento and Rovereto.
He was appointed curator of the Italian Pavilion at the 2011 Venice Biennale. Several times a member of the Italian Parliament, in 2008 he served as Cabinet Member for Culture, Arts and Sports in Milan's municipal government for six months when Mayor Letizia Moratti terminated his mandate as she saw him 'unfit for the job'. In 2012, he was removed as Mayor of Salemi by the Ministry of Interior after he failed to acknowledge Mafia interferences in his cabinet.

Biography
Vittorio Sgarbi attended the Classical Lyceum "Ludovico Ariosto" in Ferrara and then graduated in Philosophy "cum laude" at the University of Bologna, where he also specialized in History of Art. He has a younger sister, Elisabetta Sgarbi, an Italian film producer and writer.

Sgarbi made his debut on National TV as art expert on the Maurizio Costanzo Show on Canale 5. In the 1990s he had his own show, Sgarbi Quotidiani. (a pun on his name that can be read as "Daily Sgarbi" or "Daily Offences"). The show was a 15-minute recapitulation of current events. On a few episodes Sgarbi furiously attacked the Italian judges working on the Tangentopoli corruption scandal. Sgarbi also criticized the use of preventive detention in prison.

Although Sgarbi has strongly defended the role of Catholicism as a foundational element of Italian culture, he defines himself as an atheist. On ethical issues — for example, that of euthanasia or in the case of Eluana Englaro, whose life was artificially prolonged by 17 years in a vegetative coma, he sided with the Catholic Church. He has also declared his opposition to gay marriage and to marriage in general. 

While he was mayor of the Sicilian city of Salemi, he was removed from his role and the administration of the city got commissioned. According to the Minister of Interior Anna Maria Cancellieri, Sgarbi had responsibilities in the infiltration of Mafia in the management of the city, for example through the creation of fake protocols and making the administrative process slower.

In November 2017, Sgarbi was chosen by President-elect of Sicily Nello Musumeci as new Regional Assessor of Cultural Heritage.

He was re-elected as MP for Forza Italia for the 2018 general election, and was successively elected as Mayor of Sutri later in June of the same year.

Candidate to the Senate in the 2022 Italian general election, he has not been elected. Despite that, he has been nominated Undersecretary to the Culture in the Meloni Cabinet.

Sgarbi is also a columnist for il Giornale and works as an art critic for Panorama newsmagazine.

Gallery

Publications
Carpaccio - Bompiani (1979)
Palladio e la Maniera - Electa (1980)
Gnoli - Franco Maria Ricci (1983)
Tutti i musei d'Italia - Domus (1984)
Antonio da Crevalcore e la pittura ferrarese del Quattrocento a Bologna - Arnoldo Mondadori (1985)
Carlo Guarienti - Fabbri (1985)
Il sogno della pittura - Rizzoli (1985, winner of Premio Estense)
Carlo Mattioli: Antologia 1939-1986 - Il Bulino (1987)
Rovigo: Le chiese. Catalogo dei beni artistici e storici - Marsilio (1988)
Chaim Soutine - L'Obliquo (1988)
Storia universale dell'arte - Mondadori (1988)
Davanti all'immagine - Rizzoli (1989, winner of Premio Bancarella)
Giovanni Segantini: i capolavori -  Reverdito Editore (1989)
Il pensiero segreto - Sonzogno (1990)
Botero: Dipinti Sculture Disegni - Arnoldo Mondadori (1991)
Dell'Italia. Uomini e luoghi - Bompiani (1991, winner of Premio Fregene)
Lo Sgarbino. Dizionario della lingua italiana - Larus (1993)
Le mani nei capelli - Arnoldo Mondadori (1993)
Lezioni private - Arnoldo Mondadori (1996)
A regola d'arte. Libri, quadri, poesie: nuove lezioni sul bello - Arnoldo Mondadori (1998)
Alfredo Protti: 1882-1949 - Giorgio Mondadori (1998)
Aroldo Bonzagni: Pittore e illustratore (1887-1918). Ironia, satira e dolore - Mazzotta (1998) (with Antonio Forchino and Elena Bastelli)
Gli immortali - Rizzoli (1998)
La casa dell'anima. Educazione all'arte - Arnoldo Mondadori (1999)
Notte e giorno d'intorno girando - Rizzoli (1999)
Giotto e il suo tempo - Federico Motta (2000)
Le tenebre e la rosa. Un'antologia - Rizzoli (2000)
Onorevoli fantasmi: Due anni di polemiche - Arnoldo Mondadori (2000)
Balthus - Giunti (2001)
Elogio della medicina di Jacovitti - Mazzotta (2001)
Percorsi perversi - Rizzoli (2001)
Giorgio De Chirico. Dalla Metafisica alla "Metafisica". Opere 1909-1973 - Marsilio (2002)
Il Bene e il Bello. La fragile condizione umana - Bompiani (2002)
Il sogno della pittura. Come leggere un'opera d'arte - (2002)
Wolfgang Alexander Kossuth 1982-2002 - Skira (2002) (with Michael Engelhard and Mario De Micheli)
La stanza dipinta. Saggi sull'arte contemporanea - Rizzoli (2002)
Da Giotto a Picasso: Discorso sulla pittura - Rizzoli (2003)
La ricerca dell'identità da Antonello a De Chirico - Skira (2003)
L'Odéo Cornaro - Allemandi (2003) (with Lorenzo Cappellini)
Parmigianino - Rizzoli (2003)
Scaramuzza - Allemandi (2003) (with Lina Bolzoni and Simone Verde)
Un paese sfigurato. Viaggio attraverso gli scempi d'Italia - Rizzoli (2003)
Dell'anima - Gribaudo (2004) (with Massimo Listri)
Gaspare Landi - Skira (2004)
Guercino. Poesia e sentimento nella pittura del Seicento - RAI Libri (2004)
Le ceneri violette di Giorgione. Natura e Maniera tra Tiziano e Caravaggio - Skira (2004)
"San Giuseppe con il bambino" di Giovan Battista Piazzetta - Allemandi (2004)
Un capolavoro di Rubens. L'adorazione dei pastori - Skira (2004)
Aroldo Bonzagni - Mazzotta (2005) (with Antonio Forchino and Elena Bastelli)
Caravaggio e l'Europa. Il movimento caravaggesco internazionale da Caravaggio a Mattia Preti - Skira (2005)
Catalogo generale delle opere di Vincenzo Napolitano - Giorgio Mondadori (2005)
Catalogo generale delle opere di Antonio Nunziante - Giorgio Mondadori (2005) (with Paolo Levi)
I giudizi di Sgarbi. 99 artisti dai cataloghi d'arte moderna e dintorni - Giorgio Mondadori (2005)
Il ritratto interiore da Lotto a Pirandello - Skira (2005)
Ragione e passione contro l'indifferenza - Bompiani (2005)
Le meraviglie della pittura tra Venezia e Ferrara dal Quattrocento al Settecento - Silvana (2006)
Francesco del Cossa - Skira (2007)
Clausura a Milano (e non solo). Da suor Letizia a Salemi (e ritorno) - Bompiani (2008)
L'Italia delle meraviglie. Una cartografia del cuore - Bompiani (2009)
Donne e dee nei musei italiani – Bompiani (2009)
Klaus Karl Mehrkens: opere 1983-2008 - Protagon (2009)
Viaggio sentimentale nell'Italia dei desideri - Bompiani (2010)
Lo stato dell'arte/State of the Arts - Skira (2011)
L'Italia delle meraviglie - Bompiani (2011)
Le meraviglie di Roma. Dal Rinascimento ai giorni nostri - Bompiani (2011)
Piene di grazia. I volti della donna nell'arte - Bompiani (2011)
L'ombra del Divino nell'arte contemporanea - Cantagalli (2012)
L'arte è contemporanea. Ovvero l'arte di vedere l'arte - Bompiani (2012)

TV Shows
Sgarbi quotidiani (Canale 5, 1992-1999)
Dalla vostra parte (Rete 4, 2018)
Cartabianca, (Rai 3, 2018)

Notes

References
 Sciarrone, Rocco (1998). Mafie vecchie, mafie nuove: Radicamento ed espansione, Rome: Donzelli Editore

External links
 
 
 
 Articles written on il Giornale

1952 births
Living people
Writers from Ferrara
Italian Liberal Party politicians
Forza Italia politicians
Forza Italia (2013) politicians
Deputies of Legislature XI of Italy
Deputies of Legislature XII of Italy
Deputies of Legislature XIII of Italy
Deputies of Legislature XIV of Italy
Deputies of Legislature XVIII of Italy
Politicians from Ferrara
MEPs for Italy 1999–2004
Italian art critics
Italian art curators
Bancarella Prize winners
Mayors of places in Sicily
Mayors of places in Lazio